Gabon, officially the Gabonese Republic, is a sovereign state on the west coast of Central Africa located on the equator. Gabon's economy is dominated by oil. Oil revenues comprise roughly 46% of the government's budget, 43% of gross domestic product (GDP), and 81% of exports. Oil production is now declining rapidly from its high point of 370,000 barrels per day in 1997. The economy is highly dependent on extraction of abundant primary materials. Prior to the discovery of oil, logging was the pillar of the Gabonese economy. Today, logging and manganese mining are the other major income generators.

Notable firms 
This list includes notable companies with primary headquarters located in the country. The industry and sector follow the Industry Classification Benchmark taxonomy. Organizations which have ceased operations are included and noted as defunct.

See also
 List of airlines of Gabon
 List of banks in Gabon
 Economy of Gabon

References

External links

Companies of Gabon
Economy of Gabon
 
Gabon